Justin Chavez (born March 23, 1990) is an American professional soccer player.

Career

College and youth
Born in Oklahoma City, Oklahoma, Chavez attended Edmond Memorial High School and later attended the University of Tulsa, where he spent four seasons playing with the soccer side, the Tulsa Golden Hurricane. Chavez then entered the 2012 MLS Supplemental Draft where he was drafted by the Chicago Fire, however, he was never given a contract with the team.

Fort Lauderdale Strikers
On March 25, 2013 it was announced that Chavez had signed his first professional contract with the Fort Lauderdale Strikers of the North American Soccer League. He then made his debut for the Strikers on May 18 against the San Antonio Scorpions in which he came off the bench in the 78th minute for Shavar Thomas as the Strikers lost the match 1–3.

Career statistics

References

External links 
 Fort Lauderdale Strikers Profile.

1990 births
Living people
American soccer players
Tulsa Golden Hurricane men's soccer players
Fort Lauderdale Strikers players
Association football defenders
Soccer players from Oklahoma
Chicago Fire FC draft picks
North American Soccer League players
Sportspeople from Oklahoma City
Tampa Bay Rowdies players
OKC Energy FC players